Pericallis appendiculata is a species of plants in the daisy family (Asteraceae). It is endemic to the Canary islands.

References

appendiculata